Fabio Bravo (born 4 September 1989) is a former Italian footballer who played as a midfielder. In 2013 he had his only experience outside Italy playing in Romania for Liga I club Gaz Metan Mediaş.

References

1989 births
Living people
Italian footballers
Association football midfielders
Liga I players
A.C. Carpi players
CS Gaz Metan Mediaș players
Italian expatriate footballers
Expatriate footballers in Romania
Italian expatriate sportspeople in Romania